Karl Allmenröder was a German fighter ace of the First World War, credited with 30 confirmed aerial victories while flying with Jagdstaffel 11.

List of victories

This list is complete for entries, though obviously not for all details. Data was abstracted from Above the Lines: The Aces and Fighter Units of the German Air Service, Naval Air Service and Flanders Marine Corps, 1914–1918, pp. 59–60, and from The Aerodrome webpage  Abbreviations from those sources were expanded by editor creating this list.

Headnote

Aerial victories of Allmenröder, Karl
Allmenröder, Karl